Kuzuyatağı, originally and still informally called Miseyri, is a village in the Yavuzeli District, Gaziantep Province, Turkey. The village is inhabited by Alevi Turkmens of the Chepni tribe.

References

Villages in Yavuzeli District